Iguazú Falls or Iguaçu Falls are waterfalls of the Iguazu River on the border of the Argentine province of Misiones and the Brazilian state of Paraná. Together, they make up the largest waterfall system in the world. The falls divide the river into the upper and lower Iguazu. The Iguazu River rises near the heart of the city of Curitiba. For most of its course, the river flows through Brazil; however, most of the falls are on the Argentine side. Below its confluence with the San Antonio River, the Iguazu River forms the border between Argentina and Brazil.

The name Iguazú comes from the Guarani or Tupi words "y" , meaning "water", and "ûasú ", meaning "big". Legend has it that a deity planned to marry a beautiful woman named Naipí, who fled with her mortal lover Tarobá in a canoe. In a rage, the deity sliced the river, creating the waterfalls and condemning the lovers to an eternal fall. The first European to record the existence of the falls was the Spanish Conquistador Álvar Núñez Cabeza de Vaca in 1541.

Geology and geography
The staircase character of the falls consists of a two-step waterfalls formed by three layers of basalt. The columnar basalt rock sequences are part of the  Serra Geral formation within the Paleozoic-Mesozoic Paraná Basin. The number of these smaller waterfalls fluctuates from 150 to 300, depending on the water level.

Left of this canyon, another part of the river forms 160–200 individual falls, which merge into a single front during the flood stage. The largest falls are named San Martín, Adam and Eva, Penoni, and Bergano.

About  of the  length does not have water flowing over it. The water of the lower Iguazu collects in a canyon that drains into the Paraná River, a short distance downstream from the Itaipu Dam. The junction of the water flows marks the border between Brazil, Argentina, and Paraguay. Some points in the cities of Foz do Iguaçu, Brazil, Puerto Iguazú, Argentina, and Ciudad del Este, Paraguay, have access to the Iguazu River, where the borders of all three nations may be seen, a popular tourist attraction for visitors to the three cities.

The Iguazu Falls are arranged in a way that resembles a reversed letter "J". The Argentina–Brazil border runs through the Devil's Throat. On the right bank is the Brazilian territory, which is home to more than 95% of the Iguazu River basin but has just over 20% of the jumps of these falls, and the left side jumps are Argentine, which make up almost 80% of the falls.

Tourism
Aerolíneas Argentinas has direct flights from Buenos Aires to Iguazu International Airport. Azul, GOL, and LATAM Brasil offer services from main Brazilian cities to Foz do Iguaçu.

Access

The falls may be reached from two main towns, with one on either side of the falls: Foz do Iguaçu in Brazil and Puerto Iguazú in Argentina, as well as from Ciudad del Este, Paraguay, on the other side of the Paraná River from Foz do Iguaçu, each of those three cities having commercial airports. The falls are shared by the Iguazú National Park (Argentina) and Iguaçu National Park (Brazil). The two parks were designated UNESCO World Heritage Sites in 1984 and 1986, respectively.

The first proposal for a Brazilian national park aimed at providing a pristine environment to "future generations", just as "it had been created by God" and endowed with "all possible preservation, from the beautiful to the sublime, from the picturesque to the awesome" and "an unmatched flora" located in the "magnificent Iguaçu waterfalls". These were the words used by André Rebouças, an engineer, in his book Provinces of Paraná, Railways to Mato Grosso and Bolivia, which started up the campaign aimed at preserving the Iguaçu Falls in 1876. At this time, Yellowstone National Park in the US, the first national park in the world, was four years old.

On the Brazilian side, a walkway along the canyon has an extension to the lower base of Devil's Throat. Helicopter rides offering aerial views of the falls have been available from Brazil, but Argentina has prohibited such helicopter tours because of the adverse environmental impact on the flora and fauna of the falls. From Foz do Iguaçu airport, the park may be reached by taking a taxi or bus to the entrance of the park. Their park has an entrance fee on both sides. Once inside, free and frequent buses are provided to various points within the park.

The Argentine access, across the forest, is by a Rainforest Ecological Train very similar to the one in Disney's Animal Kingdom. The train brings visitors to the entrance of Devil's Throat, as well as the upper and lower trails. The Paseo Garganta del Diablo is a  trail that brings visitors directly over the falls of Devil's Throat, the highest and deepest of the falls. Other walkways allow access to the elongated stretch of falls across the forest on the Argentine side and to the boats that connect to San Martin Island. Also on the Argentine side, inflatable boat services take visitors very close to the falls.

The Brazilian transportation system aims at allowing an increase in the number of visitors, while reducing the adverse environmental impact, through an increase in the average number of passengers per vehicle inside the park. The new transportation system has a 72-passenger capacity and panoramic-view, double-deck buses.

Comparisons to other notable falls

Upon seeing Iguazu, the United States First Lady Eleanor Roosevelt reportedly exclaimed, "Poor Niagara!" (which, at 50 m or 165 feet, are a third shorter). Often, Iguazu also is compared with Victoria Falls in Southern Africa, which separates Zambia and Zimbabwe. The only wider falls are extremely large rapid-like falls, such as the Boyoma Falls (Stanley Falls).

Climate
The Iguazu Falls experience a humid subtropical climate (Cfa, according to the Köppen climate classification) with abundant precipitation and high temperatures year-round. During the summer of 2006, a severe drought caused the Iguazu River to become diminished, reducing the amount of water flowing over the falls to  until early December. This was unusual, as dry periods normally last only a few weeks. The period with the greatest volume of water flowing over the falls is usually December to February, coinciding with one of the periods of greatest rainfall.

Popular culture

Portrayals in film
Iguazu Falls has been featured in several TV shows and movies, including:

See also

List of waterfalls by flow rate

References

External links

Foz do Iguaçu; Brazilian government site (archived; in Portuguese)
Copel Monitoramento Hydrológico (Iguazu River flow rate measurements; leftmost green dot gives flow rate at Hotel Cataratas)
Iguazu Falls at UNESCO World Heritage Centre 
Iguazu Falls facts at BeautifulWorld.com

Aerial video at vimeo.com

Waterfalls of Argentina
Waterfalls of Brazil
International waterfalls
Argentina–Brazil border
Landforms of Misiones Province
Landforms of Paraná (state)
Block waterfalls
Segmented waterfalls
Environment of Paraná (state)
Foz do Iguaçu
Articles containing video clips
Tourist attractions in Misiones Province
Tourist attractions in Paraná (state)
World Heritage Sites in Argentina
World Heritage Sites in Brazil
First 100 IUGS Geological Heritage Sites